King Abdullah II Air Base is an airbase of the Royal Jordanian Air Force near Zarqa, Zarqa Governorate, Jordan.

Structure;
 Sahel Nassab Group
 No. 10 Squadron RJAF with the Bell AH-1F Cobra (SES) 
 No. 12 Squadron RJAF with the AH-1F 	
 Prince Al-Hussein Bin Abdullah II ISR Wing
 No. 9 Squadron RJAF with the Schiebel Camcopter S-100 UAV
 No. 15 Squadron RJAF with the Cessna 208 B-ISR Caravan & Cessna 208B EX Caravan
 No. 25 Squadron RJAF with the Air Tractor AT-802
 Prince Hashim Bin Abdullah II Royal Aviation Brigade
 No. 8 Squadron RJAF with the Sikorsky UH-60M Black Hawk
 No. 28 Squadron RJAF with the McDonnell Douglas MD 530FF Defender
 No. 30 Squadron RJAF with the Sikorsky UH-60L Black Hawk
 No. 32 Squadron RJAF with the CASA/IPTN AC-235

References

Military installations of Jordan